Caladenia plicata, commonly known as the crab-lipped spider orchid, is a species of orchid endemic to the south-west of Western Australia. It has a single hairy leaf and one or two red, yellow and pale green flowers with an unusual labellum which vibrates in the slightest breeze.

Description 
Flowering occurs from September to early November.

Taxonomy and naming 
Caladenia plicata was first formally described in 1882 by Robert D. FitzGerald and the description was published in The Gardeners' Chronicle. Fitzgerald noted that this is - "a very hairy species, about 1 foot high.........(The labellum is constantly moving up and down with the slightest breath of air.)" The specific epithet (plicata) is a Latin word  meaning "fold" referring to the unusual shape of the labellum.

Distribution and habitat 
The crab-lipped spider orchid is locally common, growing in a range of forested habitats, often in Casuarina thickets. It is found between Nannup and Hopetoun in the Esperance Plains, Jarrah Forest Swan Coastal Plain and Warren biogeographic regions of Western Australia.

Conservation
Caladenia plicata is classified as "not threatened" by the Western Australian Government Department of Parks and Wildlife.

References 

plicata
Orchids of Western Australia
Endemic orchids of Australia
Plants described in 1882
Endemic flora of Western Australia